Alonzo Hicks Jr. (March 7, 1922 – March 10, 1998) was an American Negro league outfielder in the 1940s.

A native of Clarksburg, West Virginia, Hicks played for the Homestead Grays in 1947. He died in Erie, Pennsylvania, in 1998 at age 76.

References

External links
 and Seamheads

1922 births
1998 deaths
Homestead Grays players
Baseball outfielders
Baseball players from West Virginia
Sportspeople from Clarksburg, West Virginia
20th-century African-American sportspeople